Karin Rodrigues (born November 8, 1971, in São Paulo) is a volleyball player.

She competed for Brazil at the 1999 FIVB Volleyball Women's World Cup, and 2000 Summer Olympics. There, she won the bronze medal with the Women's National Team. Rodrigues also claimed the gold medal at the 1999 Pan American Games.

Career
Rodrigues won the best blocker award and the gold medal in the 1995 South American  Club Championship playing with the Peruvian club Juventus Sipesa.

Individual awards
 1995 South American Club Championship – "Best Blocker"
 1996–97 Brazilian Superliga – "Best Spiker"

References

  UOL profile

1971 births
Living people
Brazilian women's volleyball players
Volleyball players at the 2000 Summer Olympics
Olympic volleyball players of Brazil
Olympic bronze medalists for Brazil
Sportspeople from São Paulo
Olympic medalists in volleyball
Medalists at the 2000 Summer Olympics
Pan American Games gold medalists for Brazil
Pan American Games medalists in volleyball
Volleyball players at the 1999 Pan American Games
Medalists at the 1999 Pan American Games